Renée Houston (born Katherina Rita Murphy Gribbin; 24 July 1902 – 9 February 1980) was a Scottish comedy actress and revue artist who appeared in television and film roles.

Biography
Born in Johnstone, Renfrewshire, into a theatrical family who performed as James Houston and Company, she toured music halls and revues with her sister Billie Houston (born Sarah McMahon Gribbin; 1906–1972) as the "Houston Sisters".  They became a leading variety act in the 1920s, sometimes performing as two children in over-sized furniture; Billie played the part of a boy.

In 1926, the sisters made a short musical film, the script of which Renée had written. It was produced by Lee De Forest, whose process, Phonofilm, enabled a soundtrack to be played alongside the film (a year before The Jazz Singer).   The sisters ended their working partnership in 1936, when Billie reportedly became ill, although it is suggested that the split may have been due to the sisters' frequent disagreements.
  
Renee Houston continued as a solo comedienne and actress, appearing in the Noel Gay revue Love Laughs!. She eventually revived her double act, this time with her third husband, the actor Donald Stewart, until his death in 1966.
 
In her later years, she specialised in "battleaxe" roles, notably as shop steward Vic Spanner's (Kenneth Cope) formidable mother in Carry On at Your Convenience (1971). She also worked for director Roman Polanski in Repulsion (1965) and Cul-de-sac (1966). She published her autobiography in 1974 which was entitled Don't Fence Me In.

Houston was also in early episodes of radio's The Clitheroe Kid, playing his Scottish mother in half a dozen 1958 broadcasts (but the role was quickly recast to use an English actress instead), and was a regular guest on radio panel show Petticoat Line chaired by Anona Winn.  According to entertainment historian Richard Anthony Baker: "So many listeners found her forthright language unacceptable that she was eventually limited to two swear words per show."

She died in London at the age of 77 on 9 February 1980.   Houston was married three times.  The second was to the actor Pat Aherne, the brother of Brian Aherne. Her third husband was the actor Donald Stewart.

Filmography

Film

Television

References

Bibliography
 Halliwell's Who's Who in the Movies HarperCollins 
 Renée Houston: Spirit of the Irresistibles by Miranda Brooke Tempest Time

External links 
 

1902 births
1980 deaths
Scottish film actresses
Scottish television actresses
Scottish women comedians
Vaudeville performers
People from Johnstone
20th-century Scottish actresses
20th-century British comedians